Dorothea Corothers "Dede" Allen (December 3, 1923 – April 17, 2010) was an American film editor.

Allen edited films such as The Hustler (1961), Bonnie and Clyde (1967), Dog Day Afternoon (1975),  and Reds (1981). She collaborated with director Arthur Penn, (1967–1976), and worked with directors Sidney Lumet, Robert Wise, Elia Kazan, and George Roy Hill. She was a member of the Board of Governors of the Academy of Motion Picture Arts and Sciences.

Early life 
Allen was born in Cleveland, Ohio. Her mother, Dorthea S. Corothers, was an actress, and her father, Thomas Humphrey Cushing Allen III, worked for Union Carbide.

At age three, Allen and her sister Manette were placed in boarding school by their mother, who had left her marriage and moved to Europe. The next year, Allen’s father died in an automobile accident while her mother remained in Europe, leaving Allen and her sister in boarding school for another six years. After leaving boarding school, Allen stayed intermittently with her mother, and they bonded through their love of film by attending the local movie theater frequently. When not with her mother, Allen attended College Preparatory School and befriended a teacher named Ruthie Jones, who encouraged her liberal politics and acted as a maternal figure. Allen studied architecture, weaving, and pottery at Scripps College in Claremont, California, where she remained passionate about film. She left Scripps to start a job as a messenger at Columbia Pictures.

Career 

In 1943, in the summer after her sophomore year of college, Allen’s grandfather secured her a job with Elliot Nugent Sr. at Columbia Pictures, which had just started hiring women because of the shortage of available male employees during World War II. She worked in the position for ten months, and then was hired into the sound effects department at Columbia. While working at Columbia, Allen took classes at The Actor’s Lab in California in acting, directing, and stage managing, which helped her master the importance of proper timing in a scene.

In 1948, Allen married Stephen Fleischman, who was working as a screenwriter in Hollywood. With Fleischman she moved to Europe and worked as a translator for two years. They moved to New York together in 1950 and Allen worked as a script clerk, even organizing a union, and was hired as an editor for commercials and industrial films at a company called Film Graphics. She began working with Carl Lerner, a screenwriter and editor who she had worked with her first summer at Columbia. Lerner recommended her to Robert Wise, where Allen edited her first important feature film, Odds Against Tomorrow (1959).

She worked closely with and was mentored by film director Robert Wise, who had also been a film editor himself (most notably having edited Orson Welles' Citizen Kane). Wise encouraged Dede Allen to be brave and experiment with her editing -- "he was the first person who said, 'No matter how many directions I give you, if it doesn't play, don't show it to me.'  He was excited as hell if I came up with something.  He had a great influence on me because he was a tremendous editor in his own time so he knew."

Much like the raw editing of dadaist filmmaking (an approach followed by René Clair early in his career) or perhaps akin to that of the French New Wave, Allen pioneered the use of audio overlaps and utilized emotional jump cuts, stylistic flourishes that brought energy and realism to characters that until that point had not been a part of classic Hollywood film editing technique. Continuity editing and screen direction (being tied to the constraints of place and time) became the low priority, while using cutting to express the micro-cultural body language of the characters and moving the plot along in an artistic, almost three-dimensional manner became her modus operandi.

In 1992, Allen accepted the position of Vice-President in Charge of Creative Development at the Warner Bros. Studio. In 2000 she returned to editing with the film Wonder Boys, for which she was nominated for her third Academy Award.

On a 2012 listing of the 75 best edited films of all time, compiled by the Motion Picture Editors Guild based on a survey of its members, three films edited by Allen appear: Bonnie and Clyde, Dog Day Afternoon, and Reds. Only George Tomasini had more films on this listing.

Variety'''s Eileen Kowalski notes that, "Indeed, many of the editorial greats have been women: Dede Allen, Verna Fields, Thelma Schoonmaker, Anne V. Coates and Dorothy Spencer."

 Personal life 

Allen married director and screenwriter  in 1948. She and Fleishman had two children, Tom (1951) and daughter, Ramey (1953). Allen was a women’s rights activist and an advocate for unions.

Allen died on April 17, 2010 in Los Angeles, California from a stroke. Her husband died on June 5, 2011.

 Selected filmography 

Academy Awards and nominations
1976 – Dog Day Afternoon, nominated for Academy Award, Best Editing
1982 – Reds, nominated for Academy Award, Best Editing (w/ co-editor Craig McKay)
2001 – Wonder Boys, nominated for Academy Award, Best Editing

Other awards and nominations
1962 – The Hustler, nominated for American Cinema Editors (ACE) Eddie, Best Edited Feature Film
1968 – Bonnie and Clyde, nominated for American Cinema Editors (ACE) Eddie, Best Edited Feature Film
1975 – Dog Day Afternoon won BAFTA Film Award, Best Editing
1982 – Reds, nominated for American Cinema Editors (ACE) Eddie, Best Edited Feature Film (w/ co-editor Craig McKay)
1982 – recipient, Women in Film Crystal Award for outstanding women who, through their endurance and the excellence of their work, have helped to expand the role of women within the entertainment industry 
1994 – honored with American Cinema Editors (ACE), Career Achievement Award
1999 – honored at Hollywood Film Festival, Outstanding Achievement in Music Editing
2000 – honored by Las Vegas Film Critics Association, Career Achievement Award
2005 – Scripps College Distinguished Alumna of the Year

 References 

 Further reading
 
 
  A solo title card means that her name appears alone on the screen while the credits are shown; the film in question was Bonnie and Clyde'' (1967).
  Biography of Allen and remarks about her by many of her editing colleagues. These were compiled on the occasion of her receipt of the Motion Picture Editors' Guild "Fellowship and Service Award" in 2008.

External links 
 

1923 births
2010 deaths
American Cinema Editors
American film editors
American women film editors
Artists from Cleveland
Best Editing BAFTA Award winners
21st-century American women